Francis William Drake (1724 – 1788 or 1789) was an officer of the Royal Navy. He served during the War of the Austrian Succession, the Seven Years' War and the American War of Independence, rising to the rank of vice-admiral of the red.

Family and early life
Not much is known of Francis William's early life. He was born in Buckland Monachorum, Devon in 1724 and was baptized on 22 August that year. He was the third son, and the second surviving son, of Anne Heathcote and Sir Francis Henry Drake. This line of Drakes descended from the brother of Elizabethan naval hero Sir Francis Drake. Francis William is often confused with his younger brother, Francis Samuel, also a naval officer whose death occurred around the same time. All four sons of Sir Francis Henry Drake had Francis as their first name, which further adds to the confusion. The sons' names were, Francis Henry, Francis Duncombe, Francis William and Francis Samuel.

Drake joined the Royal Navy at an early age (about 8 or 10). He was promoted to lieutenant, and then to commander on 18 October 1743. He was then promoted to post-captain on 29 January 1748 at the age of 23. That year he commanded  during the War of the Austrian Succession. He went out the West Indies to serve under Charles Knowles, and came across the Spanish vessel St. Judea and captured her with her 108 crew. HMS Fowey was shipwrecked at the Florida Keys while towing the St. Judea to Virginia. An investigation was launched by the Admiralty, but all were exonerated on testimony that they were the victim of a strange current.

North America
From Fowey he was appointed to command  in May 1749 until 1750 and in 1751 took command of the 24-gun . During this time he served under Commodore Sir George Rodney at Newfoundland and was sent into Conception and Trinity Bay's and as far north as Cape Bonavista where he had authority to hear appeals from decisions of fishing admirals and to enforce the various provisions of King William's Act of 1699. In 1750 Drake served as the de facto Governor of Newfoundland under Commodore Rodney, senior naval officer in 1750 and 1751, and was appointed to the position of governor in 1752.

Governorship
Drake was instrumental in making reforms in the Newfoundland justice system in the way that prisoners were incarcerated and the requirement that people charged with criminal offences had to be transported to England for trial. The instructions given to Drake were to appoint judges and commissioners oyer and terminer to hear all criminal cases except treason. After returning to England Drake had suggested additional reforms urging that the provision forbidding the execution of those convicted of criminal offences be changed. He suggested that a secure prison be built in St. John's as prisoners could easily escape or freeze to death while awaiting transport to England while incarcerated over the winter while the British cabinet determined their fate. Changes were granted including the right to execute prisoners found guilty of crimes.

Seven Years' War
Drake was appointed to command the 50-gun  in October 1755, remaining in command until 1757, when he was succeeded by his younger brother, Francis Samuel. Francis William took command of the 60-gun  in December 1758. He remained in command for the rest of the Seven Years' War. He was present at the Battle of Lagos on 18 August 1759 under Sir Edward Boscawen, the Battle of Quiberon Bay on 20 November 1759 under Sir Edward Hawke, and the Capture of Belle Île between 4 and 8 June 1761 under Augustus Keppel. Drake then went out to the West Indies again, and was present at the Battle of Havana between 6 June and 13 August 1762 under Sir George Pocock, before retiring on half pay in 1763.

Political career and further appointments
Drake's elder brother, the fifth baronet, had previously represented Bere Alston in the House of Commons. He was appointed Master of the Household in 1771, and chose not to seek re-election. Instead Francis William was elected in his place, on 29 January 1771. He voted with the government on most issues, and did not seek re-election in the 1774 general election.

He was promoted to rear-admiral of the blue on 23 January 1778 and rear-admiral of the red on 19 March 1779, taking up command in the Downs in 1779 during the American War of Independence. He flew his flag at first aboard the 60-gun  between July and November 1779, and then aboard HMS Dromedary from November 1779 until 1781. He was promoted to vice-admiral of the blue on 26 September 1780 and was given command of a squadron of the Channel Fleet under Vice-Admiral George Darby. He hoisted his flag aboard the 100-gun  and remained there until 29 December 1780.

He flew his flag for a brief time in May 1782 aboard the 60-gun , and then transferred to the 60-gun . He does not appear to have gone out with her to the Mediterranean with the fleet to relieve Gibraltar under Admiral Richard Howe. Lord Sandwich offered him further commands in the fleet under Rodney, but severe attacks of gout forced him to decline, and he eventually struck his flag and went ashore.

Family and later life

Drake's family life is confused in later records with those of his younger brother Francis Samuel. He may have married, on 23 January 1788 in Ripley, the only daughter of George Onslow, for many years the member of parliament for Guildford. A special license was apparently required as she was a minor. The same fact is recorded though for his brother, and Pooley would have actually been thirty in 1788. Sir Lewis Namier's work, The History of Parliament: the House of Commons 1754-1790, recorded that Francis William married his cousin, Elizabeth Heathcote, the daughter of Sir William Heathcote, 1st Baronet on 3 November 1763. They had two daughters; the elder Sophia (1765 - 14 June 1803), was mother of Peter, 5th Count de Salis-Soglio. Francis William Drake died in late 1788 or early 1789, or more likely December 1787.

References

Bibliography 

Government House The Governorship of Newfoundland and Labrador

|-

1724 births
1780s deaths
Royal Navy vice admirals
Governors of Newfoundland Colony
Members of the Parliament of Great Britain for Bere Alston
British MPs 1768–1774
People from Buckland Monachorum
Younger sons of baronets